Aulnay-sous-Bois is the major railway station in the town of Aulnay-sous-Bois, in the department of Seine-Saint-Denis). It is on the RER B and the Transilien K lines. The station is also the terminus for tramway T4.

Photo gallery

See also
 List of stations of the Paris RER

References

External links

 

Réseau Express Régional stations
Railway stations in Seine-Saint-Denis
Railway stations in France opened in 1875